Millie Rose Lalk (1895 – 1943) was an American painter based in Wisconsin. Her most notable work was produced in the last few years of her life.

Work
 Our Farm Buildings, oil painting.
 They're Cute When They're Small, oil painting.

References

1895 births
1943 deaths
People from Whitewater, Wisconsin
School of the Art Institute of Chicago alumni
Painters from Wisconsin
20th-century American painters
People from Fort Atkinson, Wisconsin